Péter Bornemisza (c. 1535 – 1584) was a Hungarian Lutheran bishop of noble birth. His father was killed by the Turks around the time he was six years old. A scholar from England, at the University of Cracow, first interested him in Protestantism and later Philipp Melanchthon had a strong impact on him. He later preached and printed Protestant works in his native land. In addition to religious work he proved to be a significant playwright of works such as Magyar Elektra.

Hungarian composer György Kurtág's song cycle The Sayings of Péter Bornemisza (1963–1968) for soprano and piano incorporates brief texts from Bornemisza's sermons.

References 

Hungarian male dramatists and playwrights
Hungarian Lutheran clergy
Hungarian theologians
Jagiellonian University alumni
1535 births
1584 deaths
16th-century Hungarian writers